The Belorucheiskaya narrow-gauge railway is located in Vologda Oblast, Russia.

Current status 
The Belorucheiskaya narrow-gauge railway's first line was constructed in 1922, in the area of Vytegorsky District, Vologda Oblast from the village Depo. The narrow-gauge railway operates a scheduled freight services from Depo is used for forestry tasks such as the transportation of felled logs and forestry workers. In 2014, repairs are being made to the track.

Rolling stock

Locomotives 
 TU7 – № 2240, 2355, 2406, 2463, 2880, 3334
 TU8 – № 0017, 0055, 0064
 TU6D – № 0289
 TD-5U "Pioneer"

Railroad cars 
 Boxcar
 Tank car
 Snowplow
 Dining car
 Passenger car
 Railway log-car and flatcar
 Hopper car to transport track ballast

Work trains
 Crane LP-19
 Track UPS-1

Gallery

See also
Narrow-gauge railways in Russia
List of Russian narrow-gauge railways rolling stock

References and sources

External links

 Official website ZAO Bely Ruchey
 Photo – project «Steam Engine» 
 «The site of the railroad» S. Bolashenko 

750 mm gauge railways in Russia
Railway lines opened in 1922
Logging railways in Russia
Rail transport in Vologda Oblast